Reek may refer to:

Places
 Reek, Netherlands, a village in the Dutch province of North Brabant
 Croagh Patrick, a mountain in the west of Ireland nicknamed "The Reek"

People
 Nikolai Reek (1890-1942), Estonian military commander
 Salme Reek (1907-1996), Estonian actress
 Reek da Villian, American rapper
 Walter Reek (1878–1933), German politician

Fictional characters
 Reek (fictional creature), a fictional creature in the Star Wars universe
 Reek, name given to Theon Greyjoy by Ramsay Bolton in A Song of Ice and Fire

Other uses
 Reek, to emit an unpleasant odor

Estonian-language surnames